Ronald Barritt (15 April 1919 – June 2004) was an English professional footballer who played as a striker in the Football League for Doncaster Rovers, Leeds United and York City, and in non-League football for Wombwell Town and Frickley Colliery.

References

1919 births
2004 deaths
Footballers from Huddersfield
English footballers
Association football forwards
Doncaster Rovers F.C. players
Frickley Athletic F.C. players
Leeds United F.C. players
York City F.C. players
English Football League players
Wombwell Town F.C. (1940s) players